Roller Derby Germany represents Germany in women's international roller derby, in events such as the Roller Derby World Cup.  The team was first formed to compete at the 2011 Roller Derby World Cup and finished the tournament in ninth place.

At the World Cup, Germany lost in round one to Team New Zealand, by 143 to 127.  In the consolation stage, it easily beat Team Scotland, then also beat Ireland to finish ninth.

The 2018 German team finished in 13th place at the 2018 Roller Derby World Cup in Manchester.

Team roster

2011 team roster
The team named an initial roster of twenty skaters:
(league affiliations listed as of at the time of the announcement)

References

Germany
Roller derby
Roller derby in Germany
2011 establishments in Germany
Sports clubs established in 2011